Mário Jardel de Almeida Ribeiro (born 18 September 1973) is a Brazilian former professional footballer who played as a forward. He was most noted for his positioning on the field and his heading ability. He was a legend for Grêmio, playing a major part in the squad that won the 1995 Copa Libertadores. With his exceptional positioning ability, he was able to become one of Europe's most prolific strikers during his time at Porto, Galatasaray, and Sporting CP, scoring 206 goals in 274 matches for those clubs.

After leaving Sporting CP in 2003 at age 29, Jardel had a succession of brief and unsuccessful stints at clubs in England, Italy, Spain, Cyprus, Bulgaria, Argentina and Australia. He then played for several smaller clubs in Brazil before retiring in 2011.

Jardel made his debut for the Brazil national team in 1996, making a total of 10 appearances and being selected for the 2001 Copa América.

Club career

Brazil
Jardel played first for Vasco da Gama, but moved in 1995 to Grêmio, where he played a major role in the squad that won the 1995 Copa Libertadores, scoring 12 goals to be crowned the tournament's top goal scorer, including a hat-trick in the quarter-finals against Roberto Carlos' Palmeiras, and a goal in the final against Atlético Nacional.

FC Porto
In 1996, Jardel was linked to several teams, and after failing to transfer to Benfica and Rangers (due to the strict British rules involving non-EU players), he signed with Portuguese side Porto, where with help from players such as Zlatko Zahovič, Sérgio Conceição and Ljubinko Drulović, he was the top goalscorer in Europe for three years (1998–99, 1999–00, 2001–02), with a goal average of slightly over one goal per match (130 goals in 125 matches for an average of 1.04 per match). Although he was top scorer three times, due to the use of coefficients based on each European league's standards, he only won twice, the 1998–99 and 2001–02 European Golden Boots. He lost out to Kevin Phillips in 1999–2000 despite Phillips having scored six fewer goals than Jardel.

In a 2014 interview, Jardel revealed that, during his spell at Porto, he consumed cocaine with the knowledge of both the club's doctor and physiotherapist.

Galatasaray SK
Before the 2000–01 season, Jardel was sold to Turkish club Galatasaray, winners of the 1999–2000 UEFA Cup as the club activated his release clause of US$16 million.

Scoring five goals in his debut match in the Süper Lig suggested Jardel would adapt well to his new club, but towards the end of the season, injuries and growing personal problems hinted he was soon going to leave Turkey. Regardless, he was part of the Galatasaray squad that won the 2000 UEFA Super Cup, himself scoring twice with a golden goal to beat Real Madrid 2–1 in the Super Cup match, and reached the quarter-finals of the 2000–01 UEFA Champions League, with Jardel scoring six goals in the competition and helped in victories against teams such as Rangers, Deportivo de La Coruña, Monaco, Paris Saint-Germain, Milan and Real Madrid. He ended the season with 34 goals.

Sporting CP
In 2001–02, Jardel returned to Portugal; Sporting CP signed him on the last day of transfer window and offered a contract worth €11 million over three seasons. Sporting transferred Galatasaray three players: Mbo Mpenza, Robert Spehar and Pavel Horváth (valued €3.4 million), as well as US$5 million in cash.

The 2001–02 season proved largely successful to Jardel, as he scored 42 goals in 30 matches (17 via penalties) as Sporting CP won both the Primeira Liga and the Taça de Portugal. He also won Portuguese Footballer of the Year by Record newspaper, one of the only two foreign players to achieve this, the other being the Argentinian Lisandro López.

Decline
While the 2001–02 season was arguably the best of Jardel's career, the following 2002–03 season proved to be the beginning of the end. Again omitted from the Brazil national team squad, this time for the 2002 FIFA World Cup (despite his tremendous goal-scoring abilities he was rarely called up), and unfit at the start of the season, he spent the year on the injury list.

During the Christmas break, Jardel returned to his native Fortaleza, where he injured his knee in a swimming pool fall. He scored only nine goals that season. He was granted, alongside Deco, Portuguese citizenship in February 2003.

In August 2003, Jardel moved to English club Bolton Wanderers, with Sporting CP to receive a transfer fee up to €1.5 million based on his performances in the 2003–04 and 2004–05 seasons. However, Jardel failed to score a league goal for the club, though he scored three goals in the League Cup, where Bolton were eventually losing finalists. These goals came in matches against Walsall, where Jardel scored twice, and Liverpool at Anfield.

During the winter break, Jardel went on loan to Italian side Ancona, but could not convince the staff of his physical capabilities. Ancona supporters called him "lardel" (a pun on the Italian "lardo", meaning lard) due to him being overweight. Regarding his debut against Milan, an Italian journalist also said, "We stretch a veil of silence in respect of what he has been."

In August 2004, Jardel signed a contract with Argentine club Newell's Old Boys, for which Bolton did not receive any transfer fee.

In September 2005, Jardel signed a contract with Brazilian first-division side Goiás until 31 December 2006.

Jardel returned to Portugal to sign for Beira Mar for the 2006–07 season, for an undisclosed fee. Despite arriving at the club overweight, he worked hard and trained specifically to lose weight and gain physical form and scored one goal on his debut for Beira-Mar in a 2–2 draw against Desportivo das Aves. In the winter transfer season, Jardel signed for the Cypriot team Anorthosis Famagusta.

On 14 July 2007, Jardel played for Scottish Premier League club St Mirren, as a trialist in a 3–0 win over first division side Stirling Albion.

Newcastle Jets
On 14 August 2007, Australian A-League side Newcastle United Jets officially announced at a press conference in Newcastle they had signed Jardel on a one-year contract as their marquee player. Jardel was rumoured to join the club for weeks before the official announcement was made. He arrived in Australia on 12 August 2007 and traveled to Newcastle on 13 August.

Jardel worked hard on his fitness before arriving in Newcastle. He was unable to play for the Jets in the first three rounds as he was in Australia on a tourist visa. He eventually had his sport visa approved before the start of Round 4. He made his debut as a substitute in the 70th minute at EnergyAustralia Stadium against Adelaide United in Round 4. Newcastle won the match 1–0 with a strike from Mark Bridge in the 81st minute.

After joining the Jets, Jardel saw little game time, usually making an appearance as a late substitute. The owner of Newcastle Jets, Con Constantine, who brought Jardel to Newcastle, expressed his desire for Jardel to stay on the field for longer. However, Newcastle head coach Gary van Egmond was reluctant to give the Brazilian a larger role.

On 3 November 2007, Jardel played nearly 20 minutes against Sydney FC. He showed some positive signs, nearly equalising for Newcastle with a trademark header from a Joel Griffiths corner kick. Sydney goalkeeper Clint Bolton saved the initial header before Jardel's follow-up was cleared off the line.

However, after showing glimpses of class, manager van Egmond perceived Jardel to be surplus to requirements and was told he could leave the club halfway through the season. He was reportedly being paid $3,000 per week by club owner Con Constantine. He left the club on 24 January 2008 to be with his sick mother in Brazil. The Jets went on to win the 2008 A-League Grand Final.

Brazil lower divisions (2008–10)
On 29 June 2008, Jardel joined Campeonato Brasileiro Série B club Criciúma. He scored four goals in the Brazilian Serie B season 2008. Unfortunately for Jardel his club, was relegated from Serie B; finishing 18th with 41 points from 38 games.

Jardel joined to Ferroviário on 4 February 2009. On 11 March 2009, Jardel made his Ferroviário debut with a very classy goal, a reminder of his past years of glory as one of the best finishers ever to play on the Portuguese Liga. In August 2009 he signed a 6-month contract with América de Fortaleza, but released on 30 October 2009.

On 20 January 2010, Jardel signed a contract until the end of 2010 Campeonato Piauiense with Esporte Clube Flamengo. He became a free agent on 10 June 2010.

Cherno More
On 27 June 2010, Jardel arrived in Varna, Bulgaria in order to negotiate terms with Bulgarian club Cherno More Varna. A day later, on 28 June 2010, Jardel signed a one-year contract with the Sailors and was officially presented as a new signing of the club. Jardel was welcomed by 500 fans at his presentation at the Ticha Stadium. He made his new club debut on 17 July, in a friendly match against Romanian side Victoria Brăneşti, with the match ending in a 2–2 draw.

Jardel made his competitive debut for the Sailors during the 2010–11 season on 7 August 2010 in a 0–2 away loss against Lokomotiv Plovdiv, coming on as a substitute for compatriot Marco Tiago. In the next round of A PFG Mário played 26 minutes as a substitute for a 1–0 home win against Akademik Sofia. On 31 October 2010, he scored his first goal for the Bulgarian team, scoring the only goal in a 1–0 victory over Lokomotiv Sofia.
On 28 November 2010, it was reported that Jardel had left Cherno More, in part due to concerns pertaining to the cold weather conditions in Bulgaria.

Atlético Rio Negro Clube
On 21 December 2010, it was reported that Jardel signed a one-year deal with Atlético Rio Negro Clube from Manaus, Amazonas.

International career
Jardel was capped for the national team first when he was 19 years old. In March 1993, Jardel capped one time for the Brazil national under-20 football team during the FIFA U-20 World Cup in Australia. Brazil became champions of the tournament.

Jardel's debut for the Seleçao was as a substitute replacing Ronaldo during a friendly game against Russia in August 1996.
He was also a part of the national team squad during the Copa América tournament in 2001.

Political career
In the 2014 general election, Jardel was elected to the Chamber of Deputies on the Brazilian Social Democratic Party ticket, with 41,000 votes.

According to Brazil's Public Prosecutor's Office, Jardel and 10 other people have extorted staff, nominated fake members and diverted funds for their own benefit. The Prosecutor's Office finished the accusation in February 2016 as a result of the investigation started in 2015 (Operação Gol Contra), triggering the process to terminate Jardel's term in the Chamber of Deputies. Fellow politician Marlon Santos stated at the time that Jardel was involved in activities "which are not compatible with parliamentary ethics". Jardel was also accused by Santos of being involved in drug trafficking, with Santos stating "There is clear proof that the car allocated by the parliament has been used to drive drug dealers around".

On 8 June 2016, the Parliament Ethics commission approved the request to terminate Jardel's term. The case was transferred to the Constitution and Justice Commission, who approved the case in December 2016. A final vote was held in the Parliament in December 2016 where it was unanimously decided to terminate Jardel's term.

Career statistics

Club

Honours

Club
Vasco da Gama
Campeonato Carioca: 1992, 1993, 1994

Grêmio
Copa Libertadores: 1995
Recopa Sudamericana: 1996
Campeonato Gaúcho: 1995, 1996

Porto
Primeira Liga: 1996–97, 1997–98, 1998–99
Taça de Portugal: 1997–98, 1999–2000
Supertaça Cândido de Oliveira: 1996, 1998, 1999

Galatasaray
UEFA Super Cup: 2000

Sporting CP
Primeira Liga: 2001–02
Taça de Portugal: 2001–02

Newell's Old Boys
Argentine Primera División: 2004

Goiás
Campeonato Goiano: 2006

Anorthosis
Cypriot Cup: 2006–07

Newcastle Jets
A-League: 2007–08

International
Brazil U-20
FIFA World Youth Championship: 1993

Individual
 Copa Libertadores top goalscorer: 1995
 Primeira Liga top goalscorer: 1996–97, 1997–98, 1998–99, 1999–2000, 2001–02
 Taça de Portugal top goalscorer: 1997–98, 1999–00, 2001–02
 European Golden Shoe: 1998–99, 2001–02
 UEFA Champions League top goalscorer: 1999–2000
 Portuguese Golden Ball: 1997, 1998, 2002

References

External links
 Yahoo! Sport profile
 
 
 
 CBF 

1973 births
Living people
Sportspeople from Fortaleza
Association football forwards
Brazilian footballers
Brazil international footballers
Brazil under-20 international footballers
Brazilian expatriate footballers
CR Vasco da Gama players
Grêmio Foot-Ball Porto Alegrense players
FC Porto players
Galatasaray S.K. footballers
Sporting CP footballers
Bolton Wanderers F.C. players
Newell's Old Boys footballers
A.C. Ancona players
Goiás Esporte Clube players
S.C. Beira-Mar players
Anorthosis Famagusta F.C. players
Newcastle Jets FC players
Criciúma Esporte Clube players
Esporte Clube Flamengo players
PFC Cherno More Varna players
Copa Libertadores-winning players
La Liga players
Premier League players
Serie A players
Cypriot First Division players
A-League Men players
Süper Lig players
Primeira Liga players
First Professional Football League (Bulgaria) players
Argentine Primera División players
UEFA Champions League top scorers
Brazilian expatriate sportspeople in Turkey
Expatriate footballers in Portugal
Expatriate footballers in Turkey
Expatriate footballers in Argentina
Expatriate footballers in Italy
Expatriate footballers in Cyprus
Expatriate footballers in England
Expatriate footballers in Bulgaria
Brazilian expatriate sportspeople in Argentina
Brazilian expatriate sportspeople in Cyprus
Brazilian expatriate sportspeople in Bulgaria
Brazilian expatriate sportspeople in England
Brazilian expatriate sportspeople in Italy
Brazilian expatriate sportspeople in Portugal
Expatriate soccer players in Australia
Marquee players (A-League Men)